Metal peroxides are metal-containing compounds with ionically- or covalently-bonded peroxide groups. This large family of compounds can be divided into ionic and covalent peroxide. The first class mostly contains the peroxides of the alkali and alkaline earth metals whereas the covalent peroxides are represented by such compounds as hydrogen peroxide and peroxymonosulfuric acid (H2SO5). In contrast to the purely ionic character of alkali metal peroxides, peroxides of transition metals have a more covalent character.

Bonding in O22−

The peroxide ion is composed of two oxygen atoms that are linked by a single bond. The molecular orbital diagram of the peroxide dianion predicts a doubly occupied antibonding π* orbital and a bond order of 1. The bond length is 149 pm, which is larger than in the ground state (triplet oxygen) of the oxygen molecule (3O2, 121 pm). This translates into the smaller force constant of the bond (2.8 N/cm vs. 11.4 N/cm for 3O2) and the lower frequency of the molecular vibration (770 cm−1 vs. 1555 cm−1 for 3O2).

The peroxide ion can be compared with superoxide , which is a radical, and dioxygen, a diradical.

Preparation of peroxide salts 
Most alkali metal peroxides can be synthesized directly by oxygenation of the elements. Lithium peroxide is formed upon treating lithium hydroxide with hydrogen peroxide:

 2 LiOH  +  H2O2  →   Li2O2  +  2 H2O

Barium peroxide is prepared by oxygenation of barium oxide at elevated temperature and pressure.

Barium peroxide was once used to produce pure oxygen from air. This process relies on the temperature-dependent chemical balance between barium oxide and peroxide: the reaction of barium oxide with air at 500 °C results in barium peroxide, which upon heating to above 700 °C in oxygen decomposes back to barium oxide releasing pure oxygen.  The lighter alkaline earth metals calcium, magnesium and strontium also form peroxides, which are used commercially as oxygen sources or oxidizers.

Reaction of peroxide salts
Few reactions are generally formulated for peroxide salt. In excess of dilute acids or water they release hydrogen peroxide.

Na2O2 + 2 HCl →  2 NaCl  +  H2O2

Upon heating, the reaction with water leads to the release of oxygen. Upon exposure to air, alkali metal peroxides absorb CO2 to give peroxycarbonates.

Transition metal peroxides
Unlike the alkali metal and alkaline earth metal peroxides, binary transition metal peroxides, that is, compounds containing only metal cations and peroxide anions, are rare.  Metal dioxides are pervasive, such as MnO2 and rutile (TiO2), but these are oxides, not peroxides. Well characterized examples include the d10 metal cations: zinc peroxide (ZnO2), two polymorphs (both explosive) of mercury peroxide (HgO2), and cadmium peroxide (CdO2).

Peroxide is a common ligand in metal complexes.  Within the area of transition metal dioxygen complexes,  functions as a bidentate ligand. Some complexes have only peroxide ligands, for example, chromium(VI) oxide peroxide. Similarly, molybdate reacts in alkaline media with peroxide to form red peroxomolybdate . The reaction of hydrogen peroxide with aqueous titanium(IV) gives a brightly colored peroxy complex that is a useful test for titanium as well as hydrogen peroxide.  Many transition metal dioxygen complexes are best described as adducts of peroxide.

Applications
Many inorganic peroxides are used for bleaching textiles and paper and as a bleaching additive to detergents and cleaning products. The increasing environmental concerns resulted in the preference of peroxides over chlorine-based compounds and a sharp increase in the peroxide production. The past use of perborates as additives to detergents and cleaning products has been largely replaced by percarbonates. The use of peroxide compounds in detergents is often reflected in their trade names; for example, Persil is a combination of the words perborate and silicate.

Some peroxide salts release oxygen upon reaction with carbon dioxide. This reaction is used in generation of oxygen from exhaled carbon dioxide on submarines and spaceships. Sodium or lithium peroxides are preferred in space applications because of their lower molar mass and therefore higher oxygen yield per unit weight.

 2 Na2O2 + 2 CO2 → 2 Na2CO3 + O2

Alkali metal peroxides can be used for the synthesis of organic peroxides. One example is the conversion of benzoyl chloride with sodium peroxide to dibenzoyl peroxide.

History
Alexander von Humboldt synthesized barium peroxide in 1799 as a byproduct of his attempts to decompose air.

Nineteen years later Louis Jacques Thénard recognized that this compound could be used for the preparation of hydrogen peroxide.  Thénard and Joseph Louis Gay-Lussac synthesized sodium peroxide in 1811. The bleaching effect of peroxides and their salts on natural dyes became known around that time, but early attempts of industrial production of peroxides failed, and the first plant producing hydrogen peroxide was built in 1873 in Berlin.

See also

Ozonide, 
Superoxide, 
Hydrogen peroxide

References

Anions